San Cipriano Po is a comune (municipality) in the Province of Pavia in the Italian region Lombardy, located about 40 km south of Milan and about 12 km southeast of Pavia. As of 31 December 2004, it had a population of 435 and an area of 8.7 km².

San Cipriano Po borders the following municipalities: Albaredo Arnaboldi, Belgioioso, Broni, Spessa, Stradella.

Demographic evolution

References

Cities and towns in Lombardy